Cyperus auriculatus, commonly known as the eared flatsedge, is a species of sedge that is native to some islands of Hawaii.

See also
List of Cyperus species

References

auriculatus
Plants described in 1837
Flora of Hawaii
Taxa named by Christian Gottfried Daniel Nees von Esenbeck